Bethel was a city described in the Hebrew Bible.

Bethel, Beth El, Beth-El, or Beit El may also refer to:

People 
 Bethel (surname)
 Bethel Coopwood (1827–1907), an officer in the Confederate Army in the American Civil War
 Bethel Johnson (born 1979), a former American football wide receiver.
 Bethel Leslie (1929–1999), an American actress and screenwriter
 Bethell Robinson (1861–1933), an English footballer
 Bethel Rucker (1862–1945), one of the Rucker Brothers who helped found the city of Everett, Washington
 Bethel Solomons (1885–1965), an Irish medical doctor and international rugby player
 Bethel Henry Strousberg (1823–1884), a German Jewish industrialist

Places

Australia
 Bethel, South Australia

Canada 
 Bethel, Grey County, Ontario
 Bethel, Leeds and Grenville United Counties, Ontario
 Bethel, Kawartha Lakes, Ontario
 Bethel, Prince Edward Island

Germany 
 Bethel, part of Gadderbaum, Bielefeld

Guatemala
 Bethel, El Petén, a small town on the Guatemala-Mexico border

Israel/West Bank 
 Bethel, an ancient city
 Beit El, a modern settlement

Trinidad and Tobago 
 Bethel, Tobago,  village in Tobago, Trinidad and Tobago

United Kingdom 
 Bethel, Anglesey, Wales
 Bethel, Cornwall, near St Austell, England
 Bethel, Gwynedd, Wales

United States 
 Bethel, Alaska
 Bethel Airport
 Bethel, Clarke County, Virginia
 Bethel, Connecticut, a New England town
 Bethel (CDP), Connecticut, the main village in the town
 Bethel (Metro-North station)
 Bethel, Delaware
 Bethel, Florida
 Bethel, Delaware County, Indiana
 Bethel, Wayne County, Indiana
 Bethel, Maine, a New England town
 Bethel (CDP), Maine, the main village in the town
 Bethel, Minnesota
 Bethel, Missouri
 Bethel, New York, a town in Sullivan County
 Bethel, Pine Plains, New York, a hamlet in Dutchess County
 Bethel, North Carolina
 Bethel, Ohio
 Bethel, Oklahoma (disambiguation)
 Bethel, Oregon (disambiguation)
 Bethel, Pennsylvania (disambiguation)
 Bethel, South Carolina
 Bethel, Anderson County, Texas
 Bethel, Henderson County, Texas
 Bethel, Vermont, a New England town
 Bethel (CDP), Vermont, the main village in the town
 Bethel, Washington
 Bethel, Wisconsin
 Bethel Island (California)
 Bethel Springs, Tennessee
 Bethel Township (disambiguation)

Education 
 Beit El yeshiva (Bethel Yeshiva), Bet El, Israel
 Bethel Bible College in Topeka, Kansas
 Bethel College (Indiana) in Mishawaka, Indiana
 Bethel College (Kansas) in North Newton, Kansas
 Bethel College (Kentucky) in Hopkinsville and Russellville, Kentucky
 Bethel College (Tennessee) in McKenzie, Tennessee
 Bethel High School (disambiguation)
 Bethel Junior High School in Spanaway, Washington
 Bethel Park School District in Bethel Park, Pennsylvania
 Bethel School District (Oregon)
 Bethel School District (Washington)
 Bethel School (disambiguation), historic sites in Florida and in Kansas
 Bethel University (Minnesota) in Arden Hills, Minnesota

Religion 
 Beth-El (disambiguation), Synagogues named Beth-El or Beth El
 Bethel, any branch office operated by the Watch Tower Society or other corporation associated with Jehovah's Witnesses
 Bethel, a Job's Daughters International chapter
 Bethel (god), the name of a god or an aspect of a god in some ancient middle-eastern texts
 Bethel African Methodist Episcopal Church (disambiguation)
 Bethel Baptist Church (disambiguation)
 Bethel Church (disambiguation), one of several denominations or churches

 Seamen's Bethel, chapel in New Bedford, Massachusetts

Other 
 Battle of Big Bethel, part of the blockade of Chesapeake Bay during the American Civil War
 Bethel Music, American worship group and record label
 Bethel School District v. Fraser, a United States Supreme Court decision involving free speech and public schools
 Bethel Heights Vineyard, winery in the Willamette Valley of Oregon
 Bethel Institution, hospital for the mentally ill in Bielefeld, Germany
 Baetylus, or Bethel, a type of meteoric sacred stone

See also